Marketplace Homes, LLC is a real estate services and property management company based in Detroit, Michigan, United States.

Profile 
Founded in 2002, Marketplace Homes is a broker of new home construction in the United States. According to Inc Magazine, Marketplace Homes was the 98th fastest growing real estate company in the US in 2012. With a reported $30 million in revenue in 2014, Marketplace Homes was again added to the Inc. 5000 list, marking four consecutive years on the list.

Operations 
Marketplace Homes operates primarily as a broker on new home construction deals with a couple builders in over 6 real estate markets. The company also works as a property manager for new home buyers who are unable to sell their existing homes. If those buyers are unable to sell their houses immediately, Marketplace Homes then functions as a property management company with a guaranteed leasing program.

Marketplace Homes' offerings and services to clients include:
 Brokerage of new construction homes
 Third party property management
Real estate brokerage for buying and selling homes
 Unique platform for touring and purchasing homes

References

External links 

Companies based in Wayne County, Michigan
Property management companies
Real estate companies of the United States
Real estate companies established in 2002
American companies established in 2002
American real estate websites
2002 establishments in the United States
2002 establishments in Michigan
Companies established in 2002